Trevilians is an unincorporated community in Louisa County, Virginia, United States. Trevilians has a post office with ZIP code 23170.

Grassdale, Green Springs, Ionia, and Westend are listed on the National Register of Historic Places.

Climate
The climate in this area is characterized by hot, humid summers and generally mild to cool winters.  According to the Köppen Climate Classification system, Trevilians has a humid subtropical climate, abbreviated "Cfa" on climate maps.

References

Unincorporated communities in Louisa County, Virginia
Unincorporated communities in Virginia